Beris (also Romanized as Berīs) is a village in Vilkij-e Markazi Rural District, Vilkij District, Namin County, Ardabil Province, Iran. At the 2006 census, its population was 1,204, in 273 families.

References 

Towns and villages in Namin County